This is a list of electoral results for the electoral district of Gunbower in Victorian state elections.

Members for Gunbower

Election results

Elections in the 1940s

Elections in the 1930s

 Norman Martin joined the Country Party upon being elected to parliament.

Elections in the 1920s

 Henry Angus was the sitting Nationalist MP for Gunbower.

Elections in the 1910s

References

Victoria (Australia) state electoral results by district